Lock and Dam No. 20 is a lock and dam located on the Upper Mississippi River, near Meyer, Illinois, and about one mile upstream from Canton, Missouri.

The structure is located at river mile 343.1. There is also an incomplete auxiliary lock. In 2004, the facility was listed in the National Register of Historic Places as Lock and Dam No. 20 Historic District, #04000180 covering , 1 building, 6 structures, 3 objects.

History
The Lock and Dam are on the site of the former town of Tully, Missouri. Tully was founded in 1834 and became a thriving river port and regional business hub until being virtually destroyed by major flooding in 1851. Left a crumbling "ghost town", what little that remained of Tully was finally removed during Lock and Dam No. 20's construction.

References

External links

1935 establishments in Illinois
1935 establishments in Missouri
Buildings and structures in Lewis County, Missouri
Dams completed in 1935
Dams in Illinois
Dams in Missouri
Dams on the Mississippi River
20
20
Gravity dams
Historic American Engineering Record in Illinois
Historic American Engineering Record in Missouri
Historic districts on the National Register of Historic Places in Illinois
Historic districts on the National Register of Historic Places in Missouri
20
20
Mississippi River locks
Mississippi Valley Division
National Register of Historic Places in Adams County, Illinois
National Register of Historic Places in Lewis County, Missouri
Roller dams
Transport infrastructure completed in 1935
Transportation buildings and structures in Adams County, Illinois
Transportation buildings and structures on the National Register of Historic Places in Missouri
United States Army Corps of Engineers dams